Lorenzo Suárez de Figueroa y Dormer, 2nd Duke of Feria (1559–1607) was a Spanish peer.

He was the son of Gómez Suárez de Figueroa y Córdoba, 1st Duke of Feria and Jane Dormer, an English lady-in-waiting to Mary I.
He succeeded his father at the age of 12.

He served as Spanish ambassador in Rome (1591–1592), France (1593–1595), Viceroy of Catalonia (1596–1602) and Viceroy of Sicily (1603–1607), where he strengethened the defences of the island against failed ottoman attacked, and led bombing and raiding campaigns against Alger, Tunis, Misrata and Tripoli.

He married twice: in 1577, to Isabel de Cárdenas, daughter of the Marquess of Elche, and in 1586, to Isabel de Mendoza, daughter of Íñigo López de Mendoza y Mendoza, 5th Duke of the Infantado. His second wife gave him his only surviving son and successor to the Dukedom of Feria, Gómez Suárez de Figueroa.

Life 
He was born in Mechelen, and died in Naples.

Sources
 Fundacion Medinaceli
 Casa de Feria

1559 births
1617 deaths
Dukes of Feria
Margraves of Villalba
Viceroys of Catalonia
Viceroys of Sicily
Spanish people of English descent